Roman Smishko is a retired Ukrainian professional footballer who played as a goalkeeper.

He is a younger brother of Ukrainian defender Bohdan Smishko.

Career
He played for clubs in Estonian, Lithuanian and Belarusian top levels.

In the 2014 Meistriliiga season he set the league clean sheet record by not conceding a single goal for 1,281 minutes between 5 April 2014 and 25 July 2014 which is 30 minutes short and allegedly the second best result in countries top flight after Edwin Van der Sar's 1,311 minutes.

References

External links
 
 
 

1983 births
Living people
People from Cēsis
Latvian people of Ukrainian descent
Ukrainian footballers
Association football goalkeepers
Ukrainian expatriate footballers
Expatriate footballers in Belarus
Expatriate footballers in Lithuania
Expatriate footballers in Kyrgyzstan
Expatriate footballers in Estonia
FC Portovyk Illichivsk players
FC Chornomorets-2 Odesa players
FC Dnister Ovidiopol players
FC Enerhiya Yuzhnoukrainsk players
FC Zirka Kropyvnytskyi players
FC Kryvbas Kryvyi Rih players
FC Smorgon players
FK Vėtra players
MFC Mykolaiv players
FCI Levadia Tallinn players
JK Narva Trans players
FCI Tallinn players
Esiliiga players
Meistriliiga players
Ukrainian expatriate sportspeople in Belarus
Ukrainian expatriate sportspeople in Estonia
Ukrainian expatriate sportspeople in Kyrgyzstan
Ukrainian expatriate sportspeople in Lithuania